List of international earthquake acceleration coefficients. A list of earthquake coefficients used in structural design for earthquake engineering around the world. For example, a coefficient of 0.09 indicates that a building is designed that 0.09457 of its weight can be applied horizontally during an earthquake.

Australia
From Australian Standard 1170.4. Coeffiecients are based on 10% chance exceedence in 50 years.
Adelaide - 0.10
Brisbane - 0.06
Hobart - 0.05
Melbourne - 0.08
Perth - 0.09
Sydney - 0.08
Note: Meckering, Western Australia, has the largest coefficient in Australia of 0.22.

Greece
From ΕAΚ 2003 building code

Zone 1 = 0.16g (Thrace and most of Northern Greece, Parts of Athens and Parts of Thessaloniki)
Zone 2 = 0.24g (Parts of Athens and Parts of Thessaloniki)
Zone 3 = 0.36g (Zakynthos Island, Cephalonia Island)

Other
Canada uses Spectral acceleration